Thietane is a heterocyclic compound containing a saturated four-membered ring with three carbon atoms and one sulfur atom.

Thietane, and its derivative 2-propylthietane, are strong-smelling mouse alarm pheromones and predator scent analogues. Both the mouse and human olfactory receptors MOR244-3 and OR2T11, respectively, were found to respond to thietane in the presence of copper.

References

Sulfur heterocycles
Four-membered rings
Foul-smelling chemicals